«©»CG-17 may refer to :
 AGR-14 ZAP, a U.S. Navy project to develop an anti-flak unguided rocket
 , a Guardian-class radar picket ship of the United States Navy